The Jemseg River Bridge is the name for two different structures currently crossing the Jemseg River in Jemseg, New Brunswick, Canada.

The current Jemseg River Bridge is a  haunched girder bridge which opened in October 2002 and carries the four-lane Route 2 (Trans-Canada Highway) on a much broader span with considerably less approaching grade from the west. The original Jemseg River Bridge was built in 1919 as a 3 span steel truss bridge, including a swing span. When dismantled in 1965, one half of the swing span was moved on Penniac Road (the Penniac Road Bridge was rebuilt in 2018 as a modern concrete bridge). The abutments from the original 1919 Jemseg Bridge can still be found approximately under the current Jemseg River Bridge and immediately adjacent to the Jemseg River.

See also 
 List of bridges in Canada

References

Road bridges in New Brunswick
Bridges on the Trans-Canada Highway
Transport in Queens County, New Brunswick
Buildings and structures in Queens County, New Brunswick
Bridges completed in 2002
2002 establishments in New Brunswick